Saint Sebastian Thrown into the Cloaca Maxima is a 1612 oil on canvas painting by Ludovico Carracci, now in the Getty Museum in Los Angeles, which acquired it in 1971. A preparatory drawing survives in the Louvre.

It was commissioned by Maffeo Barberini, the future Pope Urban VIII, then papal legate in Bologna for a hypogeum under his chapel in the new church of Sant’Andrea della Valle, as evidenced in a contemporary letter. That chapel would be dedicated to Saint Sebastian and was built on the site of a small 12th century chapel, popularly known as San Bastianello and erected on the site where the martyr's body had been recovered from the Cloaca Maxima, Rome's main drain. However, the plan for an underground chapel did not come to fruition and the legate did not feel the work was suitable for public display in the main chapel., replacing it with the more edifying Saint Sebastian's Body Recovered from the Cloaca Maxima by Passignano

Carracci's painting instead became part of the private Barberini family collection, appearing in several of its inventories. Carlo Cesare Malvasia, in Felsina Pittrice (1678), states the work as made "For the Lord Prince of Palestrina at Le Quattro Fontane", a title held by the Barberini family, with the Quattro Fontane being the site of their Palazzo Barberini, and as then being entitled "Palinurus Buried by Soldiers, made as a Saint Sebastian".

References

Paintings by Ludovico Carracci
Paintings in the collection of the J. Paul Getty Museum
Paintings of Saint Sebastian
1612 paintings
Oil on canvas paintings